Akerman is a national law firm ranked among the 100 largest in the United States by The American Lawyer. The firm has 24 offices across the United States and approximately 750 lawyers, with its largest office in New York City. The firm is ranked by Chambers USA, The Legal 500, Benchmark Litigation, and U.S. News-Best Lawyers as among the top practices in the United States.

History

Akerman was founded in 1920; it was formerly known as Akerman Senterfitt LLP and changed its name to Akerman LLP in 2013.  It was founded by former United States District Court Judges John Moses Cheney and Alexander Akerman as Cheney & Akerman, with offices in Orlando, Florida. By 1925, Alexander Akerman partnered with Hugh Akerman as Akerman & Akerman, after Cheney died. In 1936, Hugh Akerman and Billy Dial, who was instrumental in the founding of what is now known as SunTrust Bank, formed a partnership with William Akerman. These three men were largely responsible for the success of the firm through the 1950s, under the name Akerman, Dial & Akerman. George T. Eidson and American Bankers Association President Donald T. Senterfitt later became name partners and played significant roles in the growth and success of the firm from the 1950s through the 1980s.

Other recognition
The Legal 500: In 2022, Akerman was top-ranked nationally in middle market M&A and recognized nationally as a leading law firm for real estate, land use, construction, tax, and immigration law.

U.S. News – Best Lawyers: In 2022, Akerman was recognized with 119 "Tier One" national and regional practice rankings; corporate, real estate, and financial litigation practices top-ranked nationally. The firm also achieved significant results with 276 lawyers named to the 2023 list of The Best Lawyers in America.Law360: In 2023, Akerman's Tax Practice Group and Bankruptcy and Reorganization Practice Group were recognized as Practice Groups of the Year. The annual lists honor practice groups that stand out based on the size, complexity, and consequence of client matters handled.

Chambers: In 2022, Chambers USA recognized Akerman in 28 practice areas and singled out 67 lawyers representing 18 practices and sectors. Chambers Global recognized the firm as a leader in General Business Law: International Firms. Chambers Latin America recognized Akerman for International Arbitration with its "Highly Regarded" honor.

Financial Times: Akerman has been recognized as one of North America's most innovative law firms by the Financial Times six times.

See also
Greenberg Traurig
Holland & KNight

References

External links
 Official website

Law firms established in 1920
Intellectual property law firms
Law firms based in Miami